is a German language variant of the naval officer rank ship-of-the-line lieutenant. The rank is used by the Belgian Navy and formerly the Austro-Hungarian Navy.

Austro-Hungary

 was an officer rank in the Austro-Hungarian Navy.

The rank designation was used continuously in the Austria-Hungarian follow on countries Yugoslavia, Croatia, and Slovenia, as well as in the modern day's Austrian merchant navy.

The rank name was selected in line to the division of war ships to specific ship categories early of the 19th century, e.g. corvette, frigate, and to ship of the line. In the Austro-Hungarian Navy the appropriate rank designations were derived as follows.

According to that systematic the rank designations to subaltern – or junior officers were derived as follows:

 Linienschiffsleutnant equivalent to Hauptmann
 Fregattenleutnant equivalent to Oberleutnant
 Korvettenleutnant equivalent to Leutnant

Belgium
 is a rank used by the Belgian Naval Component. It is equivalent to a captain in the Belgian Land Component, Air Component and Medical Component.

See also
 Ranks in the Austro-Hungarian Navy
 Belgian military ranks

References 

Military ranks of Austria
Naval ranks

sl:Poročnik bojne ladje